Kazam was a UK based smartphone brand established in 2013 by former HTC employees. The brand gathered publicity by offering free screen replacements for their products.

Documents submitted to Companies House show that Kazam went into administration in April 2017 and into liquidation in April 2018.

References

Manufacturing companies established in 2013
Mobile phone manufacturers